KPOD (1240 kHz) is an AM radio station broadcasting a news–talk–sports format. Licensed to Crescent City, California, United States, the station serves the Crescent City area.  The station is currently owned by Bicoastal Media Licenses II, LLC. Its current programming features current news stories and talk radio programming weekdays from 6 AM to 6 PM. The rest of the time slots (including weekends) are filled by Fox Sports Radio.

Prior to early 2010, it was broadcasting an oldies–standards format courtesy of Citadel Media's "Timeless" format.

References

External links

POD